Riverview Correctional Facility is a medium-security state prison for men in Ogdensburg, St. Lawrence County, New York, owned and operated by the New York State Department of Corrections and Community Supervision.  

Riverview was first opened as a 700-capacity prison in 1988, one of two upstate facilities funded by New York City to house its prisoners, in a special deal between the city and state.  Together with Cape Vincent Correctional Facility the construction cost was $90 million.  The two were "almost identical" to each other and to the state facilities at Bare Hill and Franklin, built in the same years.

Ownership of both facilities was expected to revert to the state after seven years of operation.  As of 2010 Riverview had a working capacity of 882.

References 

Prisons in New York (state)
Buildings and structures in St. Lawrence County, New York
1988 establishments in New York (state)